Jerash Camp, known locally as Gaza camp, is one of the ten officially recognized UNRWA Palestinian refugee camps in Jordan. It is located outside of Irbid. Jerash camp is situated five kilometres from the Roman ruins of Jerash.

It was originally founded in 1968 as an "emergency" camp following the 1967 Palestinian exodus. In the beginning, the camp only existed out of tent encampments. Because of the unexpected period of Palestinian displacement and the enterprise of camp residents, the camp's construction has been merely ad hoc.

References

Palestinian refugee camps in Jordan
1968 establishments in Jordan
Populated places in Jerash Governorate